The 1999 Las Vegas Bowl was the eighth edition of the annual college football bowl game. It featured the Fresno State Bulldogs and the Utah Utes.

Game summary
Fresno State scored first, when Utah placekicker Cletus Truhe had his field goal attempt blocked. It was recovered by Fresno State cornerback Payton Williams and returned 75 yards for a touchdown, to make it 7–0 Fresno State. Running back Mike Anderson scored on a 34-yard touchdown run later in the 1st quarter to tie it at 7. He would finish the game with a Las Vegas Bowl record 254 yards rushing, and the game's MVP award. The second quarter would provide no scoring.

Kicker Jeff Hanna gave Fresno State a 10–7 lead in the third quarter with a 27-yard field goal. Mike Anderson would give the lead back to Utah with a 5-yard touchdown run, making it a 14–10 Utah lead. Fresno State scored in the fourth quarter, on a 2-yard touchdown run by Derrick Ward, but the all important extra point was blocked, leaving Fresno State with a 16–14 lead. Utah would later win it on a 33-yard Cletus Truhe field goal.

References

External links
Review of game by USA Today

Las Vegas Bowl
Las Vegas Bowl
Fresno State Bulldogs football bowl games
Utah Utes football bowl games
Las Vegas Bowl
December 1999 sports events in the United States